Alexander Adair Roche, Baron Roche PC (24 July 1871 – 22 December 1956) was a British barrister and law lord.

Background
Adair Roche was the second son of William Brock Roche, a doctor, and his wife Mary Fraser, daughter of William Fraser. Roche was educated at Ipswich School and studied then at Wadham College, Oxford, where he graduated with a Bachelor of Arts in 1894 and a Master of Arts in 1913. At Wadham, he was a contemporary of F. E. Smith and John Simon, both of whom became lord chancellor. He was called to the bar by the Inner Temple in 1896 and went to the Northern Circuit.

Career
Roche became a King's Counsel in 1912 and was elected a bencher in 1917. Later in that year, he was appointed to the High Court of Justice (King's Bench Division), on which occasion he was created a Knight Bachelor. He served as chairman of the Oxfordshire Quarter Sessions from 1932 and held the same post in the Central Agricultural Wages Board from 1940.

In 1934, Roche was made a Lord Justice of Appeal and was sworn of the Privy Council. On 14 October 1935 to fill a vacancy he was made a Lord of Appeal in Ordinary and created a life peerage as Baron Roche, of Chadlington in the County of Oxford. Roche retired in 1938 and a year thereafter he became Treasurer of the Inner Temple.

He subsequently chaired a Departmental Committee on justices' clerks which reported  in 1944 to the Home Secretary Herbert Morrison, recommending setting up Magistrates' Courts Committees and other reforms. This formed the basis of the Justices of the Peace Act 1949, introduced by Morrison's successor, James Chuter Ede.

Family
On 22 March 1902, he married Elfreda Gabriel, third daughter of John Fenwick and had by her two sons and a daughter.

References

External links

1871 births
1956 deaths
Alumni of Wadham College, Oxford
British King's Counsel
Knights Bachelor
Law lords
Members of the Inner Temple
Members of the Judicial Committee of the Privy Council
People educated at Ipswich School
Queen's Bench Division judges
20th-century King's Counsel
Members of the Privy Council of the United Kingdom
Lords Justices of Appeal
Life peers created by George V